Profundimitra abyssicola is a species of sea snail, a marine gastropod mollusk in the family Mitridae, the miters or miter snails.

Description
The length of the shell varies between 13 mm and 100 mm.

Distribution
This marine species occurs off Madagascar to Japan; off Northeast Australia and New Caledonia

References

 Poppe G.T. & Tagaro S.P. (2008). Mitridae. pp. 330–417, in: G.T. Poppe (ed.), Philippine marine mollusks, volume 2. Hackenheim: ConchBooks. 848 pp.

External links
 Gastropods.com: Cancilla abyssicola

Mitridae
Gastropods described in 1911